Filippo Pittarello (born 9 October 1996) is an Italian professional footballer who plays as a forward for  club Feralpisalò on loan from Cesena.

Club career
Born in Padua, Pittarello started his career in locals Serie D clubs, San Paolo in 2013, and Calcio Padova in 2014.

On 15 July 2020, he joined Serie C club Virtus Verona. Pittarello made his professional debut on 27 September 2020 against Cesena.

On 24 January 2022, he signed a 2.5-year contract with Cesena. On 29 July 2022, Pittarello was loaned to Feralpisalò, with an option to buy.

References

External links
 
 

1996 births
Living people
Sportspeople from Padua
Footballers from Veneto
Italian footballers
Association football forwards
Serie C players
Serie D players
Calcio Padova players
Calcio Montebelluna players
S.S.D. Correggese Calcio 1948 players
Imolese Calcio 1919 players
S.C. Caronnese S.S.D. players
Virtus Verona players
Cesena F.C. players
FeralpiSalò players